Las Cosas Que Nunca Nos Dijimos (English:The Things That We Never Said) is the second album by the Colombian duo, Siam, released by Colombo Records on November 1, 2012. The album's lead single, "Sencillamente", was released on June 5, 2012, to a good reception. The second single, "No Existe", was released on September 7, 2012. The song peaked at #18 in the National-Report. The third single is "Tu Cariño" was released on May 2, 2013, in Colombia and Mexico.

Track listing

References 

2012 albums
Siam (duo) albums